Ben Westwood (born 25 July 1981) is an English former rugby league footballer who played as a  or  in the Betfred Super League. He played for England and the England Knights at international level.

He previously played for the Wakefield Trinity Wildcats in the Super League before moving to the Warrington Wolves in 2002. He was part of Warrington's 2009, 2010 and 2012 Challenge Cup  winning teams. He has also played for Yorkshire.

Background
Westwood was born in Normanton, West Yorkshire, England.

Playing career

Early career
He began his career at local team Normanton Knights, before being scouted for Wakefield Trinity Wildcats.

Club career

Wakefield Trinity Wildcats
Westwood spent three seasons with Wakefield Trinity Wildcats between 1999 and 2002.

Warrington Wolves
A talismanic player for Warrington who has been top tackler at the club for the past two seasons and top tackler out of marker for the past three, Westwood was Warrington's Players' Player of the Year and Fans' Player of the Year in 2007. A conversion from the centres to the pack at the start of 2005 transformed his career and pushed him to international honours.

He was named in the Super League Dream Team for 2008's Super League XIII.

Westwood played in the 2010 Challenge Cup Final victory over the Leeds Rhinos at Wembley Stadium.

He also enjoyed a good year in 2011 despite injuries, when the Wire topped the league table.

He played in the 2012 Challenge Cup Final victory over the Leeds Rhinos at Wembley Stadium.

He played in the 2012 Super League Grand Final defeat by the Leeds Rhinos at Old Trafford.

He played in the 2013 Super League Grand Final defeat by the Wigan Warriors at Old Trafford.

He played in the 2016 Challenge Cup Final defeat by Hull F.C. at Wembley Stadium.

He played in the 2018 Challenge Cup Final defeat by the Catalans Dragons at Wembley Stadium.

He played in the 2018 Super League Grand Final defeat by the Wigan Warriors at Old Trafford.

Representative career
He was a substitute for Yorkshire against Lancashire in the second game of the expanded County of Origin series in 2002.
 
He won a call up to the Great Britain standby squad for the 2006 Tri-Nations.

In September 2008 he was named in the England training squad for the 2008 Rugby League World Cup, and in October 2008 he was named in the final 24-man England squad.

In 2011 Westwood has established himself within the elite England squad and featured in all of England's 2011 Four Nations matches. The tournament earned him the reputation of a hard-working and aggressive back-rower who thrives on intensity.

He was named in the England squad for the 2013 Rugby League World Cup.

References

External links
Warrington Wolves profile
Warrington profile
SL profile

1981 births
Living people
England national rugby league team players
English rugby league players
Rugby league second-rows
Rugby league players from Wakefield
Sportspeople from Normanton, West Yorkshire
Wakefield Trinity players
Warrington Wolves players
Yorkshire rugby league team players